The Boulder Cones are volcanic cones  southwest of Castle Rock on Hut Point Peninsula, Ross Island, Antarctica. The name, which is descriptive, was given by Frank Debenham of the British Antarctic Expedition, 1910–13, who made a plane table survey of the peninsula in 1912.

References 

Volcanoes of Ross Island